787 may refer to:
 Boeing 787 Dreamliner, a jet airliner
 AD 787, a year
 787 BC, a year
 Mazda 787/787B, a Japanese rotary-engine race car which won the 1991 Le Mans Race
 Porsche 787, a race car from the 1960s
 787 series, a train model operated by JR Kyushu
 787 (number), an integer
 Area code 787, for telephones in Puerto Rico under the North American Numbering Plan
 Interstate 787, an auxiliary Interstate Highway in Albany, New York
 “787 (song)”, a song by Ivy Queen